Electoral ink, indelible ink, electoral stain or phosphoric ink is a semi-permanent ink or dye that is applied to the forefinger (usually) of voters during elections in order to prevent electoral fraud such as double voting. It is an effective method for countries where identification documents for citizens are not always standardised or institutionalised. One of the more common election ink compositions is based on silver nitrate, which can produce a stain lasting several weeks. It was first used during the 1962 Indian general election, in Mysore State, now the modern-day state of Karnataka.

Application

Electoral stain is used as an effective security feature to prevent double voting in elections. Ink is normally applied to the left hand index finger, especially to the cuticle where it is almost impossible to remove quickly. Ink may be applied in a variety of ways, depending on circumstance and preference. The most common methods are via dipping bottles with sponge inserts, bottles with brush applicators, spray bottles, and marker pens.

Composition
Electoral stain typically contains a pigment for instant recognition, a silver nitrate which stains the skin on exposure to ultraviolet light, leaving a mark that is impossible to wash off and is only removed as external skin cells are replaced. Industry standard electoral inks contain 10%, 14% or 18% silver nitrate solution, depending on the length of time the mark is required to be visible. Although normally water-based, electoral stains occasionally contain a solvent such as alcohol to allow for faster drying, especially when used with dipping bottles, which may also contain a biocide to ensure bacteria are not transferred from voter to voter. Silver chloride can be easily removed by hydroxides, hence other photosensitive pigmentation needs to be added. Silver nitrate can cause a condition called argyria, although this requires frequent or extreme exposure.

Longevity
Election stain typically stays on skin for 72–96 hours, lasting 2 to 4 weeks on the fingernail and cuticle area. The election ink used puts a permanent mark on the cuticle area which only disappears with the growth of new nail. It can take up to 4 months for the stain to be replaced completely by new nail growth. Stain with concentrations of silver nitrate higher than 18% have been found to have no added effect on stain longevity, as silver nitrate does not have a photosensitive reaction with live skin cells. This means that the stain will fade as new skin grows. Silver nitrate is an irritant and is used as a cauterizing agent at concentrations of 25% or higher.

Colour
Electoral stain is traditionally violet in colour, before the photosensitive element takes effect to leave a black or brown mark. However, for the 2005 Surinamese legislative election, orange replaced violet as the colour for marking the voters' fingers as it was found to last just as long and be more appealing to voters, as it resembled the national colours.

Efficiency
Marker pens are the most efficient use of ink, with one 5 ml pen able to mark 600 people, although dipping bottles are often preferred, despite a 100 ml bottle only marking 1000. Dipping bottles can leave a more comprehensive stain with slightly greater longevity (depending on silver nitrate content) than markers can. However marker pens are much cheaper and easier to transport, reducing costs to the election organisers considerably, and the advised option when stains are only needed to be guaranteed for 3 to 5 days. Marker pens also leave a much smaller mark when properly applied, which is more agreeable to many voters.

Controversies
The armed guerrilla Shining Path of Peru has repeatedly threatened to kill those found with indelible ink stains to dissuade from participation in elections.

In the 2004 Afghan presidential election, allegations of electoral fraud arose around the use of indelible ink stains, which many claimed were easily washed off. Election officials had chosen to use the more efficient marker pen option; however, regular marker pens were also sent out to polling stations, which led to confusion and some people being marked with less permanent ink.

In the 2008 Malaysian general election, the election authorities canceled the use of electoral stain a week before voters went to the polls, saying it would be unconstitutional to prevent people from voting even if they had already had their fingers stained. Additionally they cited reports of ink being smuggled in from neighboring Thailand in order to mark peoples' fingers before they had a chance to vote, thus denying them their rights.

During the 2008 Zimbabwean presidential election, reports surfaced that those who had chosen not to vote were attacked and beaten by government sponsored mobs. The mobs attacked those without ink on their finger.

During the 2010 Afghan parliamentary election, the Taliban delivered night letters threatening to cut off anybody's finger who was marked with indelible ink.

During the 2013 Malaysian general election, in light of the first ever implementation of electoral stain, voters reported that the ink could be easily washed off with running water, despite assurances by the Election Commission of Malaysia on the contrary.

International use
Some of the countries that have used election ink at some point include:

Afghanistan
Albania
Algeria
The Bahamas
Dominica
Egypt
Guatemala
Honduras
India
Indonesia
Iraq
Kenya
Lebanon
Libya
Malaysia
Maldives
Mexico
Myanmar
Nepal
Nicaragua
Pakistan
Peru
Philippines
Saint Kitts and Nevis
Solomon Islands
South Africa
Sri Lanka
Sudan
Syria
Tunisia
Turkey (until 2009)
Venezuela (until 2017)

References

External links

 IFES Buyers Guide

Inks
Electoral fraud